Praecereus euchlorus is a  flowering plant in the family Cactaceae that is found in Brazil, Bolivia and Paraguay at elevations of 700 to 1300 meters

Description
Praecereus euchlorus initially grows slightly upright, is less branched and later bent over and leaning in sympathy. The slender shoots are up to 5 meters long. There are 4 to 14 low and sharp-edged ribs. The up to 20 thorns are weak, whitish, needlelike and often very unevenly long. The up to 4 middle spines, which may be missing, are up to 5 (rarely to 7.5) inches long. The much shorter edge spines have a length of 5 to 10 (rarely to 15) millimeters.

The white to greenish white flowers are up to 8 centimeters long. Their pericarpell and the flower tube are covered with very little scales and otherwise bald. The fruits are elongated.

References

External links
 
 

euchlorus
Flora of Bolivia
Flora of Paraguay